Third Hill Mountain is both the highest and most topographically prominent mountain in Berkeley County within the Eastern Panhandle of West Virginia. The long distance Tuscarora Trail passes along ridge and bench of the mountain.

Adjacent area
Together with Sleepy Creek Mountain, the two mountains contain between them Sleepy Creek Lake and the Sleepy Creek Wildlife Management Area. Sleepy Creek and Third Hill Mountains are distinctive for their height in the relatively level terrain of the far Eastern Panhandle region of West Virginia.

References

Landforms of Berkeley County, West Virginia
Mountains of West Virginia